Schlumbergera kautskyi is a species of plant in the family Cactaceae. It is endemic to a small area of the coastal mountains of south-eastern Brazil where its natural habitat is rocky areas. It is threatened by habitat loss. It is in the same genus as the popular houseplant known as Christmas cactus or Thanksgiving cactus.

Description

Schlumbergera kautskyi resembles other species of the genus Schlumbergera in that it has leafless green stems which act as photosynthetic organs. The stems  (cladodes) are composed of strongly flattened segments, which have "teeth" of varying shapes along their edges and at the ends, which are "cut off" (truncated) rather than pointed.

Special structures characteristic of cacti, called "areoles", occur at the end of the segments. The areoles, which have brown wool and short bristles, are where the flower buds appear. The flowers are usually held slightly above the horizontal with the higher side different from the lower side (zygomorphic, specifically bilaterally symmetrical).

Taxonomy

S. kautskyi was the last species of the genus Schlumbergera to be given a scientific name. In 1991, Horobin and McMillan described it as a subspecies of S. truncata, S. truncata ssp. kautsky; in the same year N.P. Taylor raised it to a full species. The specific epithet relates to the collector whose surname was Kautsky. A 2011 molecular phylogenetic study confirmed its status as a full species within the genus.

Distribution and habitat

Sites where it has been found include Pico da Pedra Azul. Because of their height and proximity to the Atlantic Ocean, the coastal mountains produce high altitude moist forests – warm moist air is forced upwards into higher, colder locations where it condenses. Schlumbergera kautskyi grows either on rocks (epilithic) or more rarely on trees (epiphytic). It is listed as "endangered" in the IUCN Red List of Threatened Species in view of the limited area in which it occurs and the threat of residential development.

References

External links
 Photograph of S. kautskyi

Flora of Brazil
kautskyi
Endangered plants
Plants described in 1991
Taxonomy articles created by Polbot